P. soli may refer to:

Paraburkholderia soli, a Gram-negative bacterium.
Paraherbaspirillum soli, a Gram-negative bacterium of the genus Paraherbaspirillum.
Parapedobacter soli, a Gram-negative bacterium.
Pararheinheimera soli, a Gram-negative bacterium.
Phycicoccus soli, a Gram-positive bacterium.
Pigmentiphaga soli, a Gram-negative bacterium.
Pontibacter soli, a Gram-negative bacterium.
Prauserella soli, a Gram-positive bacterium.
Pseudoflavitalea soli, a Gram-negative bacterium.
Pseudoxanthobacter soli, a Gram-negative bacterium.
Psychrobacillus soli, a Gram-positive bacterium.
Pusillimonas soli, a Gram-negative bacterium.